The Shanghai Municipal Education Commission is the agency of the municipal government of Shanghai in charge of education. Its headquarters are in Huangpu District.

References

External links
 Shanghai Municipal Education Commission 
 English information - City of Shanghai
 Index of topics related to the commission - City of Shanghai 

Education in Shanghai